Africorchestia is a genus of sand-hoppers in the family Talitridae.

Species
 Africorchestia fischeri (H. Milne-Edwards, 1830)
 Africorchestia quadrispinosa (K. H. Barnard, 1916)
 Africorchestia skoogi (Stebbing, 1922)
 Africorchestia spinifera (Mateus, 1962)
 Africorchestia tricornuta (Shoemaker, 1920)

References

Gammaridea